Angra dos Reis Esporte Clube, usually known simply as Angra dos Reis, is a Brazilian football team from the city of Angra dos Reis, Rio de Janeiro state, founded on March 23, 1999.

Titles
Campeonato Carioca Third Division: 1999, 2017

Stadium
The home stadium Jair Carneiro Toscano de Brito has a capacity of 5,000 people.

Colors
The official color is blue.

Club kits
The home kit is all blue with white collar.

External links
Angra dos Reis Esporte Clube at FFERJ

Association football clubs established in 1999
Football clubs in Rio de Janeiro (state)
1999 establishments in Brazil
Angra dos Reis